List of Masjids in Mandalay. During Pagan Min reign, Mindon Prince and brother Ka Naung Prince run away with their servants to Shwe Bo and started a rebellion. U Bo and U Yuet were the two Muslims who accompanied the princes. Some Kala Pyo Burmese Muslim artillery soldiers followed them.

In the  Royal Defence Army, many Cannon-crew members were  Kindar Kala Pyos and Myedu Muslims. Captain Min Htin Min Yazar’s 400 Muslims participated to clear the land for building a new Mandalay city. Kabul Maulavi  was appointed an Islamic Judge by King  Mindon to decide according to the Islamic rules and customs on Muslim affairs. 
Burmese Muslims were given specific quarters to settle in the new city of Mandalay
King Mindon donated his palace teak pillars to build a mosque at North Obo in central Mandalay. His Majesty also permitted a mosque to be built on the granted site for the Panthays Burmese Chinese Muslims.  Inside the Palace wall, for the Royal Body Guards, King Mindon himself donated and started the building of the Mosque by laying the Gold foundation at the South-eastern part of the Palace located near the present Independent Monument. This Mosque was called the Shwe Pannet Mosque. That mosque was destroyed by the British to build the Polo playground. The King donated the rest house in Mecca for his Muslim subjects performing Hajj.

Aung Mye Tharzan Township

Chan Aye Tharzan Township

Maha Aung Myae Township

Early Masjids in Mandalay, Pyigyi Tagun Township, period of Amarapura 
Approved by the Burmese Kings and Hluttaw or Parliament

Chan Mya Tharzi Township, Amarapura Period Masjids

See also 
Islam in Burma
Burmese Indians for Burmese Indian Muslims.
Burmese Malays or Malays in Burma
Panthay or Burmese Chinese Muslims.
Bingli People

References 

Islam in Myanmar

ar:الإسلام في ميانمار